Year 1365 (MCCCLXV) was a common year starting on Wednesday (link will display the full calendar) of the Julian calendar.

Events

January–December 
 March 3 – Battle of Gataskogen: Albert of Mecklenburg defeats and captures Magnus Eriksson, obtaining the throne of Sweden.
 March 12 – The University of Vienna is founded.
 June 2 – The Hungarian occupation of Vidin begins with the capture of the city by Louis I of Hungary's forces and the imprisonment of Ivan Sratsimir of Bulgaria.
 October – Alexandrian Crusade: The city of Alexandria in Egypt is sacked by an allied force of Peter I of Cyprus and the knights of the Order of St. John of Jerusalem.
 November 30 – The Nagarakretagama, a Javanese eulogy chronicling the journey of the Majapahit king, Hayam Wuruk, through his kingdom, is completed by Mpu Prapanca.

Date unknown 
 Adrianopole (modern-day Edirne) becomes the capital city of the Ottoman Sultanate.
 In modern-day southern India, Bahmani Sultan Mohammed Shah I invades the Vijayanagara Empire.
 The Sukhothai Kingdom in northern Thailand becomes a tributary state of the Ayutthaya Kingdom.
 Muhammed V begins building the Maristan of Granada (a hospital) in Granada (in modern-day Spain).

Births 
 January 27 – Edward of Angoulême, French-born royal prince of England (d. 1370)
 July 25 – U of Goryeo, Korean king (d. 1389)
 date unknown – Abd al-Karīm al-Jīlī, Baghdadi Sufi author (d. 1424)
 approximate date –  Violant of Bar, queen regent of Aragon (d. 1431)

Deaths 
 March 8 – Queen Noguk of Korea
 May 17 – Louis VI the Roman, Duke of Bavaria and Elector of Brandenburg (b. 1328)
 July 27 – Rudolf IV, Duke of Austria (b. 1339)
 December 8 – Nicholas II, Duke of Opava (b. 1288)
 date unknown – Zhu Derun, Chinese painter and poet (b. 1294)

References